The 2013 Bauer Watertechnology Cup was a professional tennis tournament played on carpet courts. It was the 17th edition of the tournament which was part of the 2013 ATP Challenger Tour. It took place in Eckental, Germany between October 28 and November 3, 2013.

Singles main-draw entrants

Seeds

 1 Rankings are as of October 21, 2013.

Other entrants
The following players received wildcards into the singles main draw:
  Kevin Krawietz
  Robin Kern
  Maximilian Marterer
  Hannes Wagner

The following players received entry from the qualifying draw:
  Piotr Gadomski
  Levente Gödry
  Mateusz Kowalczyk
  Filip Veger

Champions

Singles

 Benjamin Becker def.  Ruben Bemelmans 2–6, 7–6(7–3), 6–4

Doubles

 Dustin Brown /  Philipp Marx def.  Piotr Gadomski /  Mateusz Kowalczyk 7–6(7–4), 6–2

External links
Official Website

Bauer Watertechnology Cup
Challenger Eckental
Ecken